The American Award for Horse of the Year, one of the Eclipse Awards, is the highest honor given in American thoroughbred horse racing. Because Thoroughbred horse racing in the United States has no governing body to sanction the various awards, "Horse of the Year" is not an official national award.

The Champion award is a designation given to a horse, irrespective of age, whose performance during the racing year was deemed the most outstanding. The list below is a Champion's history  compilation beginning with the year 1887 published by the Thoroughbred Owners and Breeders Association's The Blood-Horse magazine (founded 1961), described by ESPN as "the Thoroughbred industry's most-respected trade publication".

In 1936 a Horse of the Year award was created by a poll of the staff of The New York Morning Telegraph and its sister newspaper, the Daily Racing Form (DRF), a tabloid founded in 1894 that was focused on statistical information for bettors. At the same time a rival poll was organised by the Baltimore-based Turf and Sport Digest magazine. Formed in 1942 as an advocacy group, the Thoroughbred Racing Associations (TRA) inaugurated a competing award in 1950, selecting its winners from votes by racing secretaries from member tracks across the United States. The three systems resulted in different opinions as to "Horse of the Year" Champions in 1949, 1952, 1957, 1965, and 1970. In 1971, the DRF and TRA made an agreement with the National Turf Writers Association to merge into one set of awards, called the Eclipse Awards.

Historical notes on winners
In a rare occurrence, two two-year-olds topped the balloting for 1972 American Horse of the Year honors with Secretariat edging out the filly, La Prevoyante. Secretariat received the votes of the Thoroughbred Racing Associations of North America and the Daily Racing Form, while La Prevoyante was chosen by the National Turf Writers Association.

Kelso, who placed 4th in The Blood-Horse magazine ranking of the top 100 U.S. thoroughbred champions of the 20th Century, won "Horse of the Year" honors five consecutive years. Omaha is the only winner of the U.S. Triple Crown that was not voted "Horse of the Year" honors.

Records
Most wins:
 5 – Kelso (1960, 1961, 1962, 1963, 1964)

Most wins by a trainer:
 8 – James G. Rowe Sr. (1896, 1900, 1901, 1905, 1907, 1908, 1913, 1915)

Most wins by an owner:
 6 – Calumet Farm (1941, 1942, 1944, 1947, 1948, 1949)

Honorees

Eclipse Awards

The 2003 Eclipse Awards marked a significant change in the way that honors were decided.

Under this format, voting is conducted by selected members of the National Thoroughbred Racing Association, the Daily Racing Form, and the National Turf Writers and Broadcasters (formerly National Turf Writers Association).  The winner of the Eclipse Award for American Horse of the Year is the horse who has received the most first-place votes.

The 2002 Eclipse Awards were the last conducted under a voting bloc system, in which each of the three voting groups could only cast a single collective vote based on the polling of that group's members.  In the event of an overall split vote, the award would go to the horse who had received the most points - each group's vote awarded ten points for first place, five points for second place, and one point for third place.  In the event that there was a tie on points, the award would go to the horse who had received the most individual first-place votes.

Daily Racing Form, Turf & Sport Digest and Thoroughbred Racing Association Awards

Daily Racing Form and Turf & Sport Digest Awards

The Blood-Horse retrospective champions

See also
 List of historical horses

References

Horse racing awards
Horse racing in the United States
American horse racing awards
American Champion racehorses
1936 establishments in New York (state)